Zuzana Marková (born 8 October 1952) is a Czech former swimmer. She competed in two events at the 1972 Summer Olympics.

References

1952 births
Living people
Czech female swimmers
Olympic swimmers of Czechoslovakia
Swimmers at the 1972 Summer Olympics
Sportspeople from Prague